Nina Martin is an American journalist, and reporter for ProPublica. She won a 2017 George Polk Award, and 2018 Goldsmith Prize for Investigative Reporting.

Life
She was a reported for The Baltimore Sun, The Washington Post, the International Herald Tribune, and New York Magazine. She was an editor at San Francisco magazine.

References

External links

Living people
George Polk Award recipients
Year of birth missing (living people)